Pienkowski or Pieńkowski (femenine: Pieńkowska, plural: Pieńkowscy) is a Polish surname. Notable people with the surname include:

Ignacy Pieńkowski (1877–1948), Polish painter and pedagogue 
Jan Pieńkowski (born 1936), Polish-British children's author
Marek Pienkowski (born 1945), Polish-American medical researcher and clinician
Zdzisław Pieńkowski, Polish competitive figure skater